Zehe Building, also known as the Ozark Hotel, was a historic commercial building located at Poplar Bluff, Butler County, Missouri.  It was built in 1911, and is a three-story, rectangular brick building with Colonial Revival style design influences.  It had a hipped roof and sits on a stone and concrete foundation. The central bay of the front facade features concrete balconies on both upper floors.  The building contained a hotel and other businesses until the 1980s.  As of 1/2018 it no longer exists.

It was added to the National Register of Historic Places in 1994.

References

Commercial buildings on the National Register of Historic Places in Missouri
Colonial Revival architecture in Missouri
Commercial buildings completed in 1911
Buildings and structures in Butler County, Missouri
National Register of Historic Places in Butler County, Missouri